Werner's catfish (Clarias werneri) is a species of airbreathing catfish. It is found in Burundi and Tanzania. Its natural habitats are rivers and freshwater lakes. It is threatened by habitat loss.  This species reaches a length of 23.0 cm (9.1 inches) SL.

Named in honor of Dr. F. Werner, probably Austrian herpetologist Franz Werner (1867-1939), who collected type specimen.

References

 

Clarias
Taxa named by George Albert Boulenger
Fish described in 1906
Taxonomy articles created by Polbot
Fish of Burundi
Fish of Tanzania